Santiago Tomás Giménez (born 18 April 2001) is a Mexican professional footballer who plays as a forward for Eredivisie club Feyenoord and the Mexico national team.

Club career

Cruz Azul
On 30 August 2017, Giménez made his professional debut with Cruz Azul in a Copa MX group stage match against Tigres UANL in a 2–1 victory. Two years later, on 28 August 2019, he made his Liga MX debut against Tijuana in a 3–2 loss. He would score his first goal with the club on 2 February 2020, in a league match against Toluca in a 3–3 tie, scoring within the first two minutes of the match.

In August 2021, scoring in 4 separate league matches, was named Player of the Month.

Feyenoord
On 29 July 2022, Giménez joined Feyenoord on a four-year contract. He scored his first goal for the club on 27 August, scoring the second goal in the club's 4–0 win over FC Emmen while also providing the assist for Jacob Rasmussen to score the club's third goal. On 8 September, he made his UEFA Europa League debut against Italian club Lazio in that season's edition in a group stage match, coming on as a substitute at the 64th minute and scoring twice in the club's 4–2 loss. On 3 November, after coming on as a substitute, scored the only goal in a 1–0 victory against Lazio in the UEFA Europea League group stage, granting them first place in the group and directly qualifying to the round of 16.

International career
Despite having the option of representing his native birthplace of Argentina, Giménez decided to represent Mexico, stating "I feel more Mexican than Argentine," having lived in Mexico for the majority of his time since his father moved there. He has been called up by Mexico's U-15, U-18, U-20, and U-23 teams. He made 3 appearances with the Mexico U16s at the 2016 International Dream Cup.

In September 2020, he received his first senior national team call up by Gerardo Martino for a training camp. That same month, it was reported that the Argentina national under-20 team coach Fernando Batista was interested in calling him up.

On 27 October 2021, Giménez made his senior debut for Mexico in a friendly match against Ecuador. On 8 December, he scored his first goal for Mexico in a friendly match against Chile that ended at a 2–2 draw.

In October 2022, Giménez was named in Mexico's preliminary 31-man squad for the World Cup, but did not make the final 26.

Personal life
He is the son of Christian Giménez, who also played with Cruz Azul. Apart from his native Spanish, Giménez can also speak English. Giménez is a devout Christian and was baptized in January 2019. He is married to Mexican model Fer Serrano.

Career statistics

Club

International

Scores and results list Mexico's goal tally first.

Honours
Cruz Azul
Liga MX: Guardianes 2021
Copa MX: Apertura 2018
Campeón de Campeones: 2021
Supercopa de la Liga MX: 2022
Supercopa MX: 2019
Leagues Cup: 2019

Individual
Liga MX All-Star: 2021
Liga MX Player of the Month: August 2021, September 2021

References

External links
 

2001 births
Living people
Footballers from Buenos Aires
Mexican footballers
Mexico youth international footballers
Mexico international footballers
Argentine footballers
Argentine emigrants to Mexico
Mexican people of Argentine descent
Sportspeople of Argentine descent
Association football forwards
Cruz Azul footballers
Liga MX players
Eredivisie players
Feyenoord players